The Reich Chamber of Film (Reichsfilmkammer, abbreviated as RFK) was a government agency which operated as a statutory corporation controlled by the Ministry of Public Enlightenment and Propaganda that regulated the film industry in Nazi Germany between 1933 and 1945. Membership in the association was obligatory for everyone in the German Reich who wanted to work on films in any capacity; lack of membership meant in effect a ban on employment. Based in Berlin, the establishment of the RFK was an important element of the Gleichschaltung process and Nazi film policy.

History 
The predecessor of the RFK was the Spitzenorganisation der Filmwirtschaft (SPIO; English: "Film Industry Summit Organisation") founded by Erich Pommer in 1923. Established as an interest group of film producers, the association was dissolved after the Nazi seizure of power and re-established in West Germany in 1950.

The Reichsfilmkammer was established on the basis of the Gesetz über die Errichtung einer vorläufigen Filmkammer ("Law for the Establishment of a Temporary Film Chamber") of 14 July 1933. Under the Reichskulturkammergesetz ("Law of the Reich Culture Chamber") of 22 September 1933 the Film Chamber was integrated as a subdivision of  the newly founded Reich Chamber of Culture (Reichskulturkammer) corporation. The establishment of the RFK was preceded by an ordinance of the Reich Ministry of Public Enlightenment and Propaganda, which prohibited Jews and foreigners from any participation in the German film industry.

The RFK edited the journal Film-Kurier, a leading film magazine founded in 1919 and "aryanized" in 1933. In addition, the most popular Illustrierter Film-Kurier programmes were sold in the German cinemas million fold.

The Reichsfilmkammer was officially dissolved by Law no. 2 passed by the Allied Control Council on 10 October 1945; the "Law for the Establishment of a Temporary Film Chamber" was repealed by Allied Control Council Law no. 60 on 19 December 1947.

Functions 
The Reichsfilmkammer had a key role in the film-related politics of Nazi propaganda. Its mission was principally:
 the establishment of compulsory control over all those active in any aspect of film production (production, distribution, cinema) organised in the Reichsfachschaft Film (RFF);
 the regulation of the cinema industry (e.g., admission prices, composition of programs, advertising and so on)
 the regulation of contracts, for example between filmmakers and film producers, or between theatre owners and tenants
 supervision of the Film Credit Bank (Filmkreditbank GmbH, FKB) for the financing of projects
 regulation of film exports

Direction 
The presidents of the Reichsfilmkammer reporting directly to the Reich Chamber of Culture, chaired by Minister Joseph Goebbels, were as follows:
 Fritz Scheuermann, lawyer, (1933–1935)
 Oswald Lehnich, also economics minister in Württemberg (1935–1939)
 Carl Froelich, film director (1939–1945)

Members of the  Presidential Council (Präsidialrat) were, among others: Karl Ritter, Karl Hartl, Carl Auen, and Theodor Loos. The RFK had branches in Breslau, Düsseldorf, Frankfurt, Hamburg, Königsberg, Leipzig, Munich, and Vienna.

Departments 
The Reichsfilmkammer comprised 10 departments:
 General Administration
 Politics and Culture
 Artistic Care of Filmmaking
 Film Industry
 Reichsfachschaft Film
 Film Production
 Domestic Film Distribution
 Movie Theaters
 Film and Cinema Technology
 Cultural and Commercial Film

See also 
 Department of Film (Nazi Germany)
 Nazism and cinema
 List of films made in the Third Reich

References

External links 
  Gesetz über die Einrichtung einer vorläufigen Filmkammer vom 14. Juli 1933 (text of law)
  Reichskulturkammergesetz vom 22. September 1933  (text of law)

Film organisations in Germany
Nazi propaganda organizations
Nazi culture
Mass media of Nazi Germany